Michael John Macklin (born 25 February 1943 in London) is an English-born former Australian Franciscan friar,   educator and fundraiser who was an Australian Democrats senator for Queensland (1981–1990). He later served as executive dean of the faculty of Arts, Humanities and Social Sciences at the University of New England (2002–2007).

Early life
Macklin migrated as a child with his family to Australia. He grew up in Ayr in northern Queensland and finished his schooling in Sydney.  Having spent a number of years as a Franciscan friar, he commenced university studies in Brisbane, became a teacher, married Jennie in December 1970, and completed Master's and PhD degrees at the University of Queensland, where he lectured in Philosophy of Education for eight years.

Political career
Macklin was the founding member of the Australian Democrats in Queensland and led the party in that state from 1977 to 1980, when he was elected to the Senate.

He became the party's first whip and was elected deputy leader under Janine Haines following the retirement of Don Chipp.  From 24 March to 30 June 1990, he served as interim parliamentary leader after the resignation of Haines from the Senate to contest a House of Representatives seat.  He served on eleven parliamentary committees, including those having oversight of the National Crime Authority and the Australian Security Intelligence Organisation.

Post-parliamentary career
Macklin undertook fundraising activities, including for the Australian Democrats.  As Director of Development for the University of Queensland, he was responsible for putting fundraising on a professional basis with an annual appeal and bequest programs.  He oversaw a successful capital campaign for the restoration of the Customs House, Brisbane which raised A$7.5 million in eleven months. In 1994, he was appointed inaugural CEO of Hall Chadwick Education Advisory, a specialist consultancy within a large chartered-accountancy practice and was responsible for establishing benchmarking of private school finances in Australia in conjunction with the peak body.  In June 2002, he was appointed Professor and Dean of Arts at the University of New England for a five-year term ending in 2007. He has been a member of the Queensland Land and Resources Tribunal, the National Native Claims Tribunal, and the Senate Bibliographical Committee; and has published numerous papers, academic articles and books, both fiction and non-fiction.

References
 
 Michael Macklin: Senate speeches (1980–1990)
 Michael Macklin: Occasional address to University of New England graduands, in UNE News and Events, 10 October 2006
 

Australian Democrats members of the Parliament of Australia
Members of the Australian Senate for Queensland
1943 births
Living people
Members of the Australian Senate
Leaders of the Australian Democrats
20th-century Australian politicians